Keith Albert Robinson (4 August 1930 – 11 May 2002) was an Australian rules footballer who played with Carlton and Melbourne in the Victorian Football League (VFL).

Notes

External links 

Keith Robinson's profile at Blueseum
Keith Robinson's profile at Demonwiki

1930 births
2002 deaths
Carlton Football Club players
Melbourne Football Club players
Australian rules footballers from Victoria (Australia)